1961 Dufour is a large background asteroid, approximately  in diameter, located in the outer region of the asteroid belt. It was discovered on 19 November 1973, by Swiss astronomer Paul Wild at Zimmerwald Observatory near Bern, Switzerland, and later named for 19th-century Swiss General Henri Dufour.

Classification and orbit 

Dufour is a dark C-type asteroid, that orbits the Sun in the outer main-belt at a distance of 2.8–3.6 AU once every 5 years and 8 months (2,082 days). Its orbit has an eccentricity of 0.12 and an inclination of 7° with respect to the ecliptic.

Naming 

This minor planet is named after Swiss General Henri Dufour (1787–1875), who lead the Swiss forces to victory against the renegade catholic cantons in the Sonderbund War of November 1847. The war claimed fewer than a 100 casualties.

Dufour was also a co-founder of the International Committee of the Red Cross, founder of the Swiss Federal Office of Topography and architect of the first complete geodetic survey of Switzerland. The official  was published by the Minor Planet Center on 18 April 1977. The "Dufourspitze", the Alp's second-highest mountain after the Mont Blanc, was also named in his honour.

Physical characteristics 

A two chord stellar occultation by the asteroid observed in 2004 gave an approximate diameter of 50 km.

French amateur astronomer Pierre Antonini obtained a lightcurve of Dufour from photometric observations taken during April 2010. Lightcurve analysis gave a well-defined rotation period of  hours with an amplitude of 0.31 in magnitude. In August 2013, photometric observations at the Palomar Transient Factory, California, gave a similar period of  hours with a brightness variation of 0.35.

According to the surveys carried out by the Infrared Astronomical Satellite IRAS and the Japanese Akari satellite, Dufour measures 50.3 and 51.2 kilometers in diameter and its surface has an albedo of 0.040 and 0.039, respectively. The Collaborative Asteroid Lightcurve Link derives an albedo of 0.034 and a diameter of 50.3 kilometers with an absolute magnitude of 10.8.

References

External links 
 Asteroid Lightcurve Database (LCDB), query form (info )
 Dictionary of Minor Planet Names, Google books
 Asteroids and comets rotation curves, CdR – Observatoire de Genève, Raoul Behrend
 Discovery Circumstances: Numbered Minor Planets (1)-(5000) – Minor Planet Center
 
 

001961
Discoveries by Paul Wild (Swiss astronomer)
Named minor planets
19731119